The 2019–20 NCAA football games were a series of college football bowl games played to complete the 2019 NCAA Division I FBS football season. The games began on December 20, 2019, and, aside from the all-star games that followed, ended with the 2020 College Football Playoff National Championship played on January 13, 2020.

The total of 40 team-competitive bowls in FBS, including the national championship game, was unchanged from the previous season. With the first staging of the Hula Bowl since January 2008, the number of all-star games increased from three to four.

Schedule
The schedule for the 2019–20 bowl games is below. All times are EST (UTC−5). The schedule consists of 40 bowl games in FBS (the New Year's Six bowl games, 33 additional bowl games, and the National Championship game) and one bowl game in FCS (the Celebration Bowl). Division II bowls and Division III bowls are not included here. After the National Championship game, there are additionally four all-star games scheduled.

College Football Playoff and Championship Game
The College Football Playoff system is used to determine a national championship of Division I FBS college football. A 13-member committee of experts ranked the top 25 teams in the nation after each of the last seven weeks of the regular season. The top four teams in the final ranking were seeded in a single-elimination semifinal round, with the winners advancing to the National Championship game.

The semifinal games for the 2019–20 season were the Peach Bowl and the Fiesta Bowl. Both were played on December 28, 2019, as part of a yearly rotation of three pairs of six bowls, commonly referred to as the New Year's Six bowl games. The winners advanced to the 2020 College Football Playoff National Championship at Mercedes-Benz Superdome in New Orleans, Louisiana, scheduled for January 13, 2020.

Each of the games in the following table was televised by ESPN.

Non CFP bowl games
For the 2019–20 bowl season, the Dollar General Bowl changed sponsors to become the LendingTree Bowl. The Cure Bowl, previously held at Camping World Stadium, changed venues to Exploria Stadium—both are in Orlando, Florida. As the First Responder Bowl's usual venue of the Cotton Bowl in Dallas was unavailable due to a scheduling conflict with the 2020 NHL Winter Classic, the 2019 edition was played at Gerald J. Ford Stadium in nearby University Park, Texas.

FCS bowl game
The FCS has one bowl game. They also had a championship bracket that culminated in the 2020 NCAA Division I Football Championship Game.

All-star games
Organizers renamed the East–West Shrine Game to East–West Shrine Bowl. The Hula Bowl returned for its first playing since January 2008.

Team selections

CFP top 25 standings and bowl games
 
 
On December 8, 2019, the College Football Playoff selection committee announced its final team rankings for the year. Two of the four semifinalists – Clemson and Oklahoma – had also been semifinalists the previous season.  This was the sixth year of the College Football Playoff era, and the first year that Alabama was not in the semifinals.

Conference champions' bowl games
Two bowls featured a matchup of conference champions—the Fiesta Bowl and the Peach Bowl. Rankings are per the above CFP standings.

Bowl-eligible teams

Generally, a team must have at least six wins to be considered bowl eligible, with at least five of those wins being against FBS opponents. The College Football Playoff semi-final games are determined based on the top four seeds in the playoff committee's final rankings. The remainder of the bowl eligible teams are selected by each respective bowl based on conference tie-ins, order of selection, match-up considerations, and other factors.

However, six teams (Army, East Carolina, Florida, Hawaii, Liberty and Virginia Tech) needed to win seven games to become bowl eligible for the 2019–20 season – Army and Hawaii because their regular season consisted of 13 games, and the other four because they defeated two FCS teams during the season. At season's end, Florida, Hawaii, Liberty, and Virginia Tech were bowl-eligible with at least seven wins each, while Army and East Carolina did not reach the seven win threshold.

ACC (10): Boston College, Clemson, Florida State, Louisville, Miami (FL),  North Carolina, Pittsburgh, Virginia, Virginia Tech, Wake Forest
American (7): Cincinnati, Memphis, Navy, SMU, Temple, Tulane, UCF
Big Ten (9): Illinois, Indiana, Iowa, Michigan, Michigan State, Minnesota, Ohio State, Penn State, Wisconsin
Big 12 (6): Baylor, Iowa State,  Kansas State, Oklahoma, Oklahoma State, Texas
C-USA (8): Charlotte, FIU, Florida Atlantic, Louisiana Tech, Marshall, Southern Miss, UAB, Western Kentucky
MAC (8): Buffalo, Central Michigan, Eastern Michigan, Kent State, Miami (OH), Ohio, Toledo, Western Michigan
Mountain West (7):  Air Force, Boise State, Hawaii, Nevada, San Diego State, Utah State, Wyoming
Pac-12 (7): Arizona State, California, Oregon, USC, Utah, Washington, Washington State
SEC (9): Alabama, Auburn, Florida, Georgia, Kentucky, LSU, Mississippi State, Tennessee, Texas A&M
Sun Belt (5): Appalachian State, Arkansas State, Georgia Southern, Georgia State, Louisiana
Independent (3): BYU, Liberty, Notre Dame

Number of bowl berths available: 78
Number of bowl-eligible teams: 79

Bowl-eligible teams that did not receive a berth

As there were more bowl-eligible teams than there were bowl berths available, one team that was bowl-eligible (Toledo, 6–6) did not receive an invitation.

Bowl-ineligible teams
ACC (4): Duke, Georgia Tech, NC State, Syracuse
American (5): East Carolina, Houston, South Florida, Tulsa, UConn
Big Ten (5): Maryland, Nebraska, Northwestern, Purdue, Rutgers
Big 12 (4): Kansas, TCU, Texas Tech, West Virginia
C-USA (6): Middle Tennessee, North Texas, Old Dominion, Rice, UTEP, UTSA
MAC (4): Akron, Ball State, Bowling Green, Northern Illinois
Mountain West (5): Colorado State, Fresno State, New Mexico, San Jose State, UNLV
Pac-12 (5): Arizona, Colorado, Oregon State, Stanford, UCLA
SEC (5): Arkansas, Missouri, Ole Miss, South Carolina, Vanderbilt
Sun Belt (5): Coastal Carolina, Louisiana–Monroe, South Alabama, Texas State, Troy
Independent (3): Army, New Mexico State, UMass

Number of bowl-ineligible teams: 51

Television ratings

Most watched non-CFP bowl games

CFP Rankings.

College Football Playoff
All times Eastern.

Notes

References

Further reading